Thomas Wheeler may refer to:

Thomas Wheeler (MP) (died 1574), Member of Parliament (MP) for Ludlow
Thomas Wheeler (soldier) (1620–1676), American colonial soldier and writer
Thomas J. Wheeler (1803–1875), American physician and New York state senator
Thomas Martin Wheeler (1811–1862), British radical activist and insurance society manager
Tom Wheeler (born 1946), American FCC Chairman
Thomas C. Wheeler (born 1948), American federal judge
Tom Wheeler (writer), American television writer and producer
Norman Wheeler (Thomas Norman Wheeler, 1915–1990), British army officer

See also

 Wheeler (surname)